A referendum on electoral reform was held on April 23, 2019,  in the Canadian province of Prince Edward Island – simultaneously with the 2019 provincial election – to determine if the province should adopt a mixed-member proportional representation voting system (MMP). A narrow majority voted to keep the existing first-past-the-post system. However, the referendum was not binding, as neither the yes or no side received majority support in 60% or more of the province's 27 electoral districts.

Background
A referendum on the issue was held October 27 to November 7, 2016.  That referendum asked which of five voting systems residents would prefer to use in electing members to the Legislative Assembly of Prince Edward Island. The referendum, after four instant run-off rounds, indicated mixed member proportional representation was the preferred choice with over 52% support on the final ballot.

Premier Wade MacLauchlan said after the vote that he is doubtful the result of the referendum "can be said to constitute a clear expression of the will of Prince Edward Islanders" due to the low voter turnout relative to provincial general elections. As the result of political pressure, MacLauchlan's government introduced a motion in the Legislative Assembly of Prince Edward Island to hold another referendum on electoral reform at the next provincial general election, stating that the low turnout for the referendum did not provide a mandate to implement the change and the need for a more specific referendum question with two choices. A motion by Green Party leader Peter Bevan-Baker to implement mixed-member proportional representation in line with the referendum results was defeated on November 22, 2016, by a vote of 6–20.

On June 12, 2018, legislation governing the new referendum passed in the legislature.

Referendum question and threshold
The Electoral System Referendum Act passed by the Legislative Assembly of Prince Edward Island on June 13, 2018, set the referendum question as:

Should Prince Edward Island change its voting system to a mixed member proportional voting system?
 No 
 Yes

(According to the Act, "No" was required to appear on the referendum ballot above "Yes")

In order for the referendum to be legally binding, either side was required to receive a majority of voters in at least 60% (17) of the province's 27 provincial electoral districts. Before the results were announced, Gerard Mitchell, the referendum commissioner, confirmed the 60% threshold saying if the vote was close "whoever is governing will have to make a decision".

Campaign
The campaign period for the referendum began on February 1, 2019, and applications opened for Yes and No campaigns to apply for public funding.

During the campaign, Premier (and Liberal leader) Wade MacLauchlan did not take a public position on the vote. The leaders of all other parties, however, were on record as supporting a move to MMP. The leaders were also asked about their referendum positions in the CBC Leaders' Debate.

Opinion polls

Results
The referendum was defeated, with 15 districts voting to adopt MMP and 12 voting to maintain the current system. The popular vote was a narrow majority in favour of keeping the current first-past-the-post system.  Neither side, however, received a majority in 60% of districts (17/27) and therefore the referendum was not binding on the government. A recount in District 20 widened the FPTP victory somewhat, with the final popular vote approximately 52% for FPTP and 48% for MMP.

Aftermath 
Following the preliminary results, Brenda Oslawsky of Vote Yes P.E.I. said that the result showed there was "significant support" for MMP, and that the group was calling on the government to convene a citizens assembly to study electoral reform.  Responding to the results, Progressive Conservative leader Dennis King said Islanders have an interest in furthering the conversation on how they govern themselves and elect members of the legislature. He said he would like to see continued discussion of electoral reform in the Legislature. Peter Bevan-Baker, leader of the Green Party, called the results "agonizingly close" and said it is inevitable that proportional representation is coming but that PEI is not going to be the province leading the charge.

John Barrett of No What to Vote said the result was closer than expected but they were pleased with the result overall. Calling the result decisive, he said "Fifty-one per cent is a win and we'll take it". Barrett also said electoral reform is not off the table going forward, noting that his group was not opposed to electoral reform, only the specific model which had been proposed (MMP).

References

External links
 
  – registered opponent group
 Vote Yes PEI  – registered proponent group
 Electoral System Referendum Act 

2019 elections in Canada
2019 in Prince Edward Island
Prince Edward
Electoral reform referendums in Canada
Referendums in Prince Edward Island
April 2019 events in Canada